The Manor Operatic Society is an amateur operatic society based in Sheffield, England.

The society was formed in the 1950s on Sheffield's Manor estate. It produces the biggest amateur pantomime in England, presented at Sheffield City Hall each year. The society presented its first pantomime in 1970 and has produced a new show every year since then. The shows used to be staged at the Montgomery Theatre but in 1986 the venue was moved to the Sheffield City Hall to cope with demand.

The pantomime attracts a total audience of up to 25,000 each year.

Principal cast (2017)

 Emma Holmes
 James Smith
 Isabelle Sykes
 Jack Skelton
 Simon Hance
 Digory Holmes
 Holly Parker-Strawson
 Robert Spink
 Chris Hanlon
 Ewan Revill
 Tom Walker
 Harry Lynch-Bowers
 Emily Mae Hoyland
 Andy Finnerty
 Liam Gordon
 Fern Strawson
 Paul Hill
 Lee Stott
 Emily McGeoch
 Richard Coddington
 Emily Siddall
 Lauren Lomas
 Grace Stoddart
 Holly Mae Norris
 Hollie Marsden
 Rachael Walkden
 Rhianna Cutworth
 Evie May Braford (<16 cast member)
 Benji Povey (<16 cast member)

The principal cast are joined on stage by an ensemble and members of a dance school (Ellie Bailey, Rachael Hackett, Alice Mee and Autumn Wade).

Montgomery Theatre productions (1966 to 1986)
 1966 – Maid of the Mountains (Musical)
 1967 – The Merry Widow (Musical)
 1968 – Summer Song (Musical)
 1969 – Quaker Girl (Musical)
 1970 – Magyar Melody (Musical)

1971 - Aladdin (Pantomime)

1971 - Finians Rainbow (Musical)

1973 - The Sound of Music (Musical)

1974 - Oklahoma (Musical)

1975 - Jack and the Beanstalk (Pantomime)

1975 - A Funny Thing (Musical)

1976 - Jorrocks (Musical)

1977 - Mother Goose (Pantomime)

1977 - Chrysanthemum (Musical)

1978 - Humpty Dumpty (Pantomime)

1978 - Good Companions (Musical)

1979 - Cinderella (Pantomime)

1979 - CanCan (Musical)

1980 - Queen of Hearts (Pantomime)

1980 - Follow the Star (Musical)

1981 - Goody Two Shoes (Pantomime)

1981 - Make Me an Offer (Musical)

1982 - Aladdin (Pantomime)

1982 - Godspell (Musical)

1983 - Sleeping Beauty (Pantomime)

1983 - Most Happy Fella (Musical)

1984 - Red Riding Hood (Pantomime)

1984 - A Funny Thing (Musical)

1985 - Robinson Crusoe (Pantomime)

1985 - Pippin (Musical)

1986 – Jack and the Beanstalk (pantomime)

1986 – Andy Capp (musical)

Sheffield City Hall productions (1987 to present)
 2008/09 - Jack and the Beanstalk
 2009 - Godspell
 2009/10 - Cinderella
 2010 - Annie
 2010/11 - Sleeping Beauty
 2011 - Carousel
 2011/12 - Dick Whittington
 2012 - The Wizard of Oz: The Musical
 2012/13 - Aladdin
 2013 - Beauty and the Beast
 2013/14 - Snow White and the Seven Dwarves
 2014 - Me and My Girl
 2014/15 - Peter Pan
 2015 - Ghost: The Musical
 2015/16 - Cinderella
 2016 - Barnum
 2016/17 - Jack and The Beanstalk
 2017 - Singin' in the Rain: The Musical
 2017/18 - Sleeping Beauty

References

Culture in Sheffield